Mukriyan or 'Deryaz' was a Kurdish principality from the late 14th century to the 19th century centered around Mahabad. Mukriyan was a neighbor to the Emirate of Bradost.

Geography and tribes
Mukriyan encompassed the area south of Lake Urmia, including the cities of Mahabad, Piranshahr, Oshnaviyeh, Sardasht and Bukan with the city of Naqadeh historically being included in Mukriyan, though today Kurds only make up approximately 35% of the city. The city of Saqqez is culturally very similar to Mukriyan, though politically it acted more as its own city-state.
A few tribes include Dehbruki, Gewirk, Mangur (tribe), Mukri, Amireh, Khelki, Sheikh Sherefi, Selekei, Ḥasan Khāli, Kārish, Silki, Sekir, Fekiyesi, Ables, Bārik, Soleimāni, Beyi, Omerbil, Merzink, Lētāu Māwet, and Shiwezāi.

History
Before Mukris, the region was ruled by Hadhabanis, the region is also in the same, or similar, location as Mannea and Takht-e Soleymān. During the battle of Dimdim, Mukriyanis rallied around Kurds of Bradost. Abbas I of Persia married a Mukri noblewomen in 1610 AD.

See also
Republic of Mahabad
Mukri tribe

References

Sources

Further reading

Battle of Dimdim
Former Kurdish states in Iran
Kurdish dynasties
States and territories established in the 14th century
States and territories disestablished in the 19th century